Battle of İnönü is the name of two battles of the Greco-Turkish War (1919–1922):

First Battle of İnönü
Second Battle of İnönü